Alpirsbach is a town in the district of Freudenstadt in Baden-Württemberg, Germany.

Because of the local brewery “Alpirsbacher Klosterbräu“, the monastery with the cloister concerts and the famous movable organ, as well as the Black Forest Ultra Cycling Marathon “SURM“, Alpirsbach is well-known beyond the region.

History
Alpirsbach developed as a market town around Alpirsbach Abbey, a Benedictine monastery founded in 1095. The monastery and its holdings were ceded to the Duchy of Württemberg by the Peace of Westphalia. Alpirsbach received town privileges in 1869 and was connected by railroad in 1886. The township was reassigned to the district of Freudenstadt in 1938. After World War II, it began expanding along the steep mountain slopes of the Kinzig river.

Geography

The  Federally-protected nature reserve is located within Alpirsbach.

Politics and administration

Mayors         

 1819–1833: Johann Georg Faßnacht
 ????–1848: Köstlin
 1848–1850: Schliz
 1857–1882: Albert Heinzelmann
 1882–1889:
 1889–1895: Ernst Gottlob Schöck
 1895–1918: Wilhelm Rieker
 1918–1926: Wilhelm Schwarz
 1926–1933: Friedrich Reichert
 1933–1945: Otto Rommel (NSDAP, afterwards mayor of Holzgerlingen)
 1945–1948: Robert Faulhaber
 1949–1967: Otto Müller (between 1938 and 1945 mayor of Holzgerlingen)
 1967–1974: Hans Volle (CDU, afterwards administrative head of the district Tuttlingen)
 1974–2000: Peter Dombrowsky (CDU, afterwards administrative head of the district Freudenstadt)
 2000–2008: Roland Wentsch (independent)
 2008–2016: Reiner Ullrich (SPD)
 since 2016: Michael E. Pfaff (independent)

Municipal council 
After the election on 25 May 2019 the municipal council of Alpirsbach consists of: 

1 Unabhängige Bürgerliste

2 Zukunft für Alpirsbach

Constituent communities 
Alpirsbach is divided into Alpirsbach itself and the constituent communities Ehlenbogen, Peterzell, Reinerzau, Reutin and Römlinsdorf.

Town partnerships 
Since the small Black forest town and the French town Neuville-sur-Saône established an official town partnership in 1973 numerous visits and events have taken place. For example, there is a regular school exchange of the French Colleges Jean Renoir and Notre Dame de Belgarde and the German schools Progymnasium Alpirsbach and the local Realschule.

Coat of arms
The municipal coat of arms for Alpirsbach displays a crosier in golden upon a field of azure. This device was originally the coat of arms of Alpirsbach Abbey from the 15th century until its dissolution, and came to represent Alpirsbach in 1827. The coat of arms was approved by the Freudenstadt district office on 13 August 1976, though it had been in official use since 1953.

Infrastructure

Educational facilities 
Toddlers and children can be looked after in one of Alpirsbach's seven kindergartens. Afterwards, they go to the Alpirsbach Primary School or its branch in Peterzell. After primary school, children can attend one of the three secondary schools in town or go to secondary schools in the proximity immediately. The Sulzberg educational center in Alpirsbach houses the Werkrealschule and Realschule Oberes Kinzigtal and the Progymnasium Alpirsbach. To obtain their A-Levels pupils must continue their studies in one of the bigger towns nearby such as Freudenstadt. The nearest universities are in Freiburg, Tübingen, Karlsruhe and Stuttgart.

Public health and care 
At least three general practitioners and three dentists practise in Alpirsbach. There are two pharmacies as well as an old people's home in the town center. The nearest hospital is in Freudenstadt - about 20 km away.

Public safety 
Alpirsbach has its own police station. The local voluntary firebrigades of Alpirsbach-Rötenbach, Ehlenbogen, Reinerzau and the so-called Höhenstadtteile ensure fire protection.

Cultural facilities and tourism 
Alpirsbach attracts many visitors and tourists from all over the world every year. People come to visit one of the classical cloister concerts or find their favourite beer and enjoy live music during the Hopfenfest.

During the visit, you can see many historic buildings such as the monastery of Alpirsbach with its movable organ or the old town hall with its arcades. There are also numerous old framework houses. One of the most striking of them is certainly the restaurant Löwenpost.

Besides the Löwenpost, there are many other good restaurants such as the Bella Roma, the Zwickel und Kapps and the Rössle. You can drink delicious cocktails in the Muggelcaf, a bar which is very popular with locals.  If you have a sweet tooth, you will be happy in the confectionery Heinzelmann which manufactures fine chocolates or the Café am Kloster which offers a broad variety of delicious cakes every day.

Visitors will notice that many of the houses in the old town are covered with small wood boards which are typical of the Black forest. In one of them, you can find the Offizin, which is a printing press museum. Here you can take part in printing workshops or marvel at the mechanisms of old printing presses. On the upper floor of the house you can find a small art gallery.

In the town center you can also find the old brewery building in which there is a brewery museum and a shop. There are regular guided tours that give insight into the process of brewing. Nearby you will find an affectionately arranged museum of town history. Over several floors, the various crafts and the history of the town are presented here. Another old craft is maintained by a glassblower and can be viewed live by visitors to the glassblowing workshop.

The library of Alpirsbach which is found in the "Haus des Gastes" offers a huge variety of books.

Recreational facilities and sport 
The citizens of Alpirsbach are happy to have their own public swimming pool in Rötenbach. There are also a tennis court, a golf court, a football field and two gyms to do sport, if you do not want to go on a mountain bike or walking tour around town.

Behind the monastery you can rest in the small but well-kept spa garden.

Clubs and associations 
The citizens of Alpirsbach can join a variety of clubs and associations.

Transport 
The B294, which runs through Alpirsbach, connects the town with Freudenstadt in the north and via the B462 with Schramberg in the south. Alpirsbach is centrally located between the A5 and A81 motorways. Via the Murg valley in the west, you can reach the A5 within 1 hour, heading for Frankfurt, Karlsruhe or Basel, Freiburg. In the opposite direction, it takes about 40 minutes to reach the A81, which leads to Stuttgart or Lake Constance.

Alpirsbach is located on the railroad line Freudenstadt - Hausach – Offenburg. Trains run every hour. Destinations like Stuttgart, Karlsruhe and Straßburg can thus be reached easily by changing the train only once.

References

External links 

 Official website (in German)
 Alpirsbach: pictures

Freudenstadt (district)
Württemberg